This is a list of earth deities.

African mythology

Akan mythology
 Asase Yaa, the goddess of the harsh earth, Truth and Mother of the Dead
 Asase Afua, the Goddess of the lush earth, fertility, love, procreation and farming

Egyptian mythology
 Geb, god of the earth, vegetation, earthquakes, and snakes

Igbo mythology
 Ala, alusi of the earth, morality, fertility, and creativity

Yoruba mythology
 Babalú-Ayé, orisha of the earth, healing, smallpox, respect for the elderly

European mythology

Baltic mythology
 Žemyna, goddess of the earth

Celtic mythology
 Danu, ancient goddess of the earth

Etruscan mythology
 Cel, goddess of the earth

Finnish mythology
 Akka, goddess of the earth

Georgian mythology
 Mindort-batoni, god of the mountains

Germanic mythology
 Nerthus, earth goddess

Greek mythology
 Demeter, goddess of the harvest, sacred law, and the earth
 Gaia, titan goddess of the earth

Norse mythology
 Jörð, goddess of the earth
 Skaði, goddess of the mountains and winter
 Sif, goddess of the earth

Roman mythology
 Ceres, goddess of the harvest, motherhood, and the earth
 Terra, goddess of the earth

Slavic mythology
 Mat Zemlya, ancient goddess of the earth
 Mokosh, goddess of fertility, moisture, women, the earth, and death
 Veles, horned god of the underworld, water, the earth, wealth, and cattle

Asian mythology

Ainu mythology
 Cikap-kamuy, god of owls and the earth

Anatolian mythology
 Cybele, mother goddess of the earth

Chinese mythology
 Houtu, goddess of the earth
 Tudigong, local god of the earth

Gondi mythology
 Bhivsen or Bhimal, god of the earth
 Bhum, goddess of the earth and mother of humanity

Hittite mythology
 Sarruma, god of the mountains
 Ubelluris, mountain god who bears the world in his shoulders

Hindu mythology
 Bhumi, goddess of the earth
 Prithvi, goddess of the earth

Meitei mythology
 Leimarel Sidabi, goddess of the earth, creation, nature, and the household

Sumerian mythology
 Ki, goddess of the earth
 Ninhursag, mother goddess of the earth, fertility, mountains, and rulers

Thai mythology
 Phra Mae Thorani, goddess of the earth who stopped the demons from attacking the Buddha

Turkic and Mongolian mythology
 Etugen Eke, goddess of the earth

American mythology

Aztec mythology
 Tlaltecuhtli, the earth deity whose body created the world

Haudenosaunee mythology
 Hah-nu-nah, the turtle that bears the world.

Lakota mythology
 Maka-akaŋ, the earth goddess

Inca mythology
 Apu, a deity of the mountains
 Mama Pacha, the goddess of the earth

Oceanian mythology

Hawaiian mythology
 Papahānaumoku, goddess of the earth

Maori mythology
 Papa, goddess of the earth

See also
 Earth god, Earth goddess

 
Earth